The 2007 Guatemala City sinkhole is a  deep sinkhole which formed in Guatemala City in 2007, due to sewage pipe ruptures. Its collapse caused the deaths of five people, and the evacuation of over a thousand.

Formation
The sinkhole was created by fluid from a sewer eroding uncemented volcanic ash, limestone, and other pyroclastic deposits underlying Guatemala City. The hazards around the pipe have since then been mitigated, by improved handling of the city's wastewater and runoff, and plans to develop on the site have been proposed. However, critics believe municipal authorities have neglected needed maintenance on the city's aging sewerage system, and have speculated that more piping failures are likely to develop unless action is taken.

Several rainstorms also contributed to the sinkhole's collapse, as stormwater percolated into the ground, further dissolving the rocks beneath Guatemala City. Citizens of Guatemala City near the sinkhole also reported hearing rumblings a few weeks before its collapse. The INSIVUMEH (Guatemala's seismology institute) had placed a seismic meter there before the disaster; a robotic camera system was supposed to enter the cavity, but the disaster occurred first.

Collapse
On 23February2007, the sinkhole collapsed, forming a very large, deep circular hole with vertical walls and killing five people. Its location was in a poor neighbourhood in northeastern Guatemala City, at the intersection of 24 Avenida and 6 Calle. As a result, one thousand people were evacuated from the area. Police established a  no-go zone around the sinkhole. The hole was later filled in with soil cement made from cement, limestone, and water known locally as lodocreto. $2.7 million was spent by the Guatemalan government in order to fill the sinkhole and to redirect sewage pipes around the area.

References

2007 natural disasters
21st century in Guatemala City
21st-century sinkholes
2007 in Guatemala
Natural disasters in Guatemala
Landforms of Guatemala
Sinkholes of North America